Fox Family Movies was a Southeast Asian pay television channel owned by Fox Networks Group Asia Pacific, a subsidiary of Disney International Operations. The channel was initially available in Singapore via StarHub TV and Indonesia via Indovision, but it had expanded to Taiwan and Philippines and it broadcast to the rest of Southeast Asia.

Overview and History
Fox Family Movies has first-run contracts for movies distributed by Disney, (20th Century Studios), (Walt Disney Pictures), Universal Pictures, Paramount Pictures, Metro-Goldwyn-Mayer, Warner Bros., StudioCanal, as well as featured movies from other movie distributors including Lionsgate, Summit Entertainment and The Weinstein Company. This movie channel targets family-oriented movies providing a unique opportunity for young and old to bond over the best movie magic. The channel offers at least 60 different movies every month and a primetime premiere every Friday, along with eye-catching thematic nights and special programming events to keep viewers glued to the TV screen, it is another competitor to HBO Family Asia. Unlike Fox Movies and Fox Action Movies this channel is also available in Dual Language for some movies. This channel is similar to those of Fox Movies in the Middle East. This channel, unlike Fox Movies (Philippine feed), has no commercial breaks during the movie. In the Philippine feed of the channel (distributed by OmniContent Management Inc.) it uses 4:3 letterbox for the SD channel simulcast from the SEA feed and during commercials, the SEA feed will replaced by the local feed for the teaser to other Fox Networks Group Philippines channels as well as local advertisements, it reverts to SEA feed where the movie plays.

Due to agreement between Fox Networks Group, The Walt Disney Company and Astro, FOX Family Movies cannot appear other Malaysian TV providers until February 1, 2018, this channel is available on Unifi TV channel 403.

On October 1, 2021, Fox Family Movies (along with Fox Movies & Fox Action Movies) including 15 Disney owned channels would cease operations at around 1:00 am (Philippines & Malaysia) or 12:00 am (Indonesia, Thailand & Vietnam) after 11 years of broadcasting after Annabelle Hooper and the Ghosts of Nantucket aired as its final film, however the Middle East and North Africa feed of the channel, along with FX and Fox Crime, were operating until its cessation on December 1, 2022, outlived its main Asia feed.

References

External links
  (archived)

Mass media in Southeast Asia
Cable television in Hong Kong
Defunct television channels
Fox Movies (TV channel)
Fox Networks Group
Television channels and stations established in 2010
Television channels and stations disestablished in 2022
English-language television stations
Movie channels in Singapore
Movie channels in Malaysia
Movie channels in Indonesia
Movie channels in Hong Kong
Movie channels in Thailand
Movie channels in the Philippines